Quakertown North was a census-designated place in Oakland County,  Michigan during the 1970 United States Census. The population in recorded was 7,101. The census area, along with the neighboring communities merged to the newly created city Farmington Hills in 1973. The ZIP code serving the area is 48331.

Geography
Located at approximately 42.520255 north and 83.382004 west, the census area of Quakertown North was located north of the former municipality of Quakertown.  The land area of the CDP was 1.6 square miles and a housing unit count of 1,803.

References

 
Former census-designated places in Michigan
1973 disestablishments in Michigan
Populated places in Oakland County, Michigan